Singularity Rising: Surviving and Thriving in a Smarter, Richer, and More Dangerous World is a book by James D. Miller that covers a broad spectrum of topics associated with the technological singularity, including cognitive enhancement and AI.

References

2012 non-fiction books
Futurology books
Singularitarianism
BenBella Books books